opened in Tottori, Tottori Prefecture, Japan in 1978. It houses the collection of Tottori resident Dr Hajime Watanabe, which includes Buddhist sculptures, Chinese, Korean, and Japanese ceramics, ukiyo-e, and over two hundred sets of samurai armour.

See also
 Tottori Prefectural Museum
 Tottori Castle

References

External links

 Watanabe Museum Of Art 

1978 establishments in Japan
Museums established in 1978
Museums in Tottori Prefecture
Art museums and galleries in Japan
Ceramics museums in Japan
Biographical museums in Japan
Sculpture galleries in Asia
Tottori (city)